Cajetan von Spreti (1905-1989) was a German paramilitary activist and functionary of the working regime of the Nazi system.

On 1 June 1930, he joined the Nazi Party (membership number 254,085) and the Sturmabteilung, and became involved in the statefounded terror; in October 1931 he rose to the rank of Sturmfuhrer.

Einsatzstab Spreti 
During the German occupation of the Soviet Union he led an Einsatzstab (Operations staff) to recruit a workforce in the Ukraine.

References

1905 births
1989 deaths
Nazi Party members
Sturmabteilung officers
Unfree labor during World War II